Chah Malek (also Romanized as Chāh Malek) is a village in Biabanak Rural District, in the Central District of Khur and Biabanak County, Isfahan Province, Iran. At the 2006 census, its population was 1,302, in 370 families.

References 

Populated places in Khur and Biabanak County